Marko Lasica (born 30 April 1988) is a Montenegrin handball player for Redbergslids IK and the Montenegrin national team.

Achievements
Liga Națională:
Bronze Medalist: 2016
Montenegrin League:
Winner: 2007, 2009, 2010
EHF Cup:
Winner: 2014

References

External links

1988 births
Living people
Montenegrin male handball players
Sportspeople from Nikšić
Expatriate handball players in Turkey
Montenegrin expatriate sportspeople in Spain
Montenegrin expatriate sportspeople in Hungary
Montenegrin expatriate sportspeople in Greece
Montenegrin expatriate sportspeople in Romania
Montenegrin expatriate sportspeople in Turkey
SC Pick Szeged players
Beşiktaş J.K. Handball Team players
RK Partizan players
Liga ASOBAL players